This is a list of the municipalities in the province of Zaragoza (Saragossa in English) in the autonomous community of Aragon, Spain. There are 293 municipalities in the province.

See also List of Aragonese comarcas.

See also

Geography of Spain
List of cities in Spain

 
Zaragoza